Ben Johnston (born ) is an Ireland international rugby league footballer who plays as a  or  for Doncaster in Betfred League 1.

He has previously played for the Castleford Tigers (Heritage № 930) in the Super League and the York City Knights in the Championship. Johnston has spent time on loan from York at the Dewsbury Rams in the Kingstone Press Championship and spent six seasons with Halifax in the Championship.

Background
Johnston was born in York, Yorkshire, England.

Club career
Johnston made his Super League début for the Castleford Tigers against the London Broncos in 2012.

Doncaster RLFC
On 17 Sep 2020 it was reported that he had signed for Doncaster RLFC in the RFL League 1

International
In 2014, Ben was a late call-up to Mark Aston's Ireland national rugby league team's squad for the 2014 European Cup tournament. Ben played in 2 of the 3 games available.

In October and November 2015, he appeared for Ireland again in the following year's European Cup competition.

References

External links
Halifax profile
Castleford Tigers profile

1992 births
Living people
Castleford Tigers players
Dewsbury Rams players
Doncaster R.L.F.C. players
English rugby league players
Halifax R.L.F.C. players
Ireland national rugby league team players
Rugby league five-eighths
Rugby league fullbacks
Rugby league halfbacks
Rugby league players from York
York City Knights players